The Winmau BDO 9-Dart Club was an initiative launched and partnered by the British Darts Organisation and long-term sponsor Winmau in January 2013, which celebrated the 40th anniversary of the British Darts Organisation, with membership restricted to darts players that achieve a nine-dart finish at BDO / WDF major and open events.

Players that achieve this feat are presented with a unique set of laser-etched tungsten darts in a laser-etched aluminium presentation case as a permanent keepsake from Winmau. There is no specified limit as to how many times a player or team can be inducted if they achieve a nine-dart finish at BDO / WDF major and open events.

Tournaments 
The following list of tournaments qualify players for admittance into the Winmau BDO 9-Dart Club if they achieve a nine-dart finish;

BDO World Darts Championship
Winmau World Masters
BDO World Trophy1
Winmau BDO British Classic
BDO British Open

BDO Gold Cup
BDO International Open
Scottish Open (SDA)
Scottish Masters (SDA)2

Welsh Open (WDO)
Welsh Classic (WDO)
EDO England Open3
Winmau EDO England Matchplay4

Zuiderduin Masters (NDB)
Dutch Open (NDB)
Six Nations Cup
BDO British Internationals

1Wasn't on the original list of qualifying tournaments as the event was announced towards end of 2013.
2Wasn't on the original list of qualifying tournaments, only included after Gary Stone achieved a nine-dart finish at the Scottish Masters in June 2013.
3 and 4Weren't on the original list of qualifying tournaments, but both the EDO England Open and the EDO England Matchplay were later added to the list.

Inductees 
The first player to be inaugurated into the Winmau BDO 9-Dart Club was John Walton that January. He became the first and so far only player to achieve a nine-dart finish at the Winmau World Masters in 2007. Glen Durrant and Claire Stainsby became the first mixed pairs team inaugurated into the Winmau BDO 9-Dart Club after making history by achieving the first ever nine-dart finish in mixed pairs competition at the BDO International Open in 2013.

Glen Durrant became the first member to be inaugurated twice in the same season after achieving a nine-dart finish at the EDO England Open in 2013 also. Only after Gary Stone achieved a nine-dart finish at the Scottish Masters in 2013 was the event added to the list of qualifying tournaments, with Gary Stone also being inaugurated into the Winmau BDO 9-Dart Club.

Notable absentees 
Since inductees John Walton and Christian Pratt achieved their nine-dart finishes in years prior to the Winmau BDO 9-Dart Club being established, the following list of players who did the same at the list of qualifying tournaments (listed above) could be seen as a notable absentees from the Winmau BDO 9-Dart Club.

 Paul Lim - 1990 BDO World Darts Championship
 Shaun Greatbatch - 2002 Dutch Open
 Gary Anderson - 2005 BDO Gold Cup
 Tony O'Shea - 2007 International Darts League (not a listed event, but was a BDO / WDF major event)
 Brian Dawson - 2008 Welsh Open
 Darryl Fitton - 2009 Zuiderduin Masters
 John Walton - 2010 Six Nations Cup
 Ted Hankey - 2010 BDO International Open
 Ted Hankey - 2011 Scottish Open
 Darryl Fitton - 2015 Dutch Open
 Martin Adams - 2015 BDO International Open

References

External links 
Winmau BDO 9 Dart Club Winmau.

Darts
Darts in the United Kingdom